Henle's layer is the third and the outermost layer of the inner root sheath of the hair follicle, consisting of a single layer of cubical cells with clear flattened nuclei. It is named after German physician, pathologist and anatomist Friedrich Gustav Jakob Henle.

References

External links
 

Hair anatomy